Perrin Creek is a  long 2nd order tributary to the Dan River in Halifax County, Virginia.

Course 
Perrin Creek rises about 1.5 miles northwest of Centerville, Virginia, and then flows generally north to join the Dan River at the southeast border of South Boston.

Watershed 
Perrin Creek drains  of area, receives about 45.7 in/year of precipitation, has a wetness index of 415.55, and is about 52% forested.

See also 
 List of Virginia Rivers

References

Watershed Maps 

Rivers of Virginia
Rivers of Halifax County, Virginia
Tributaries of the Roanoke River